Ramón Méndez (1829 – 19 June 1867) was a Mexican Imperial general who was best known for ordering the executions of Carlos Salazar Ruiz and José María Arteaga on October 21, 1865, as part of Maximilian's new Black Decree that was signed that year.

Second French Intervention in Mexico
Méndez was a conservative and like many Conservative military personnel, he sided with the new Second Mexican Empire. He was promoted to General and would go on to participate in several battles in the war. 

On October 13, he won a key victory over the Republicans at Santa Ana Amatlán in Michoacán, capturing both Carlos Salazar Ruiz and José María Arteaga. Eleven days earlier Maximilian I of Mexico had ratified the "Black Decree" which would execute anyone committing guerrilla warfare against the Mexican Empire. Since Méndez deemed Ruiz and Arteaga to be leaders of the republican guerrilla forces, he ordered their executions by firing squad, along with other officers tried for the same reason.

After the executions, Méndez would go on to participate in the Siege of Querétaro as he brought around 4,000 infantry as reinforcements. Méndez himself was captured during the siege and was executed on June 19, 1867, as retaliation for his executions of Republican prisoners.

References

1829 births
1867 deaths
Mexican generals
Mexican monarchists
Executed Mexican people
People executed by Mexico by firing squad
People executed for treason against Mexico
Executed military personnel
Second French intervention in Mexico
Conservatism in Mexico
19th-century Mexican politicians
19th-century Mexican military personnel